The 2017 FIFA Confederations Cup was the 10th and final edition of the FIFA Confederations Cup, a quadrennial international men's football tournament organised by FIFA. It was held in Russia, from 17 June to 2 July 2017, as a prelude to the 2018 FIFA World Cup.

Russia was announced as the host on 2 December 2010 after the country was awarded the  hosting rights of the 2018 FIFA World Cup. The matches were played in four stadiums in four cities: Saint Petersburg, Moscow, Kazan, and Sochi. It was the first time Russia had hosted the tournament, and the third time the Confederations Cup was held in the European continent. As hosts, Russia qualified automatically for the tournament; they were joined by the six winners of the FIFA confederation championships and the 2014 FIFA World Cup champions, Germany.

The final tournament was played in two stages: a group stage and a latter knockout stage. In the group stage, each team played three games in a group of four, with the winners and runners-up from each group advancing to the knockout stage. In the knockout stage, the four teams competed in single-elimination matches, beginning with the semi-finals and ending with the final match of the tournament. A third-place match was played between the two losing semi-finalist teams. The final match was also attended by young participants of the international children's social programme Football for Friendship from 64 countries.

The defending champions, Brazil, who won the previous three Confederation Cups (2005, 2009, 2013), failed to qualify for the first time since 1995 following their loss on penalties to Paraguay in the quarter-finals of the 2015 Copa América. 2015 AFC Asian Cup winners Australia became the first team to qualify from multiple confederations, having previously represented the OFC in 1997, 2001 and 2005. This was the first and only Confederations Cup to feature the video assistant referee (VAR).

World champions Germany won their first and only title following a 1–0 win over Chile in the final.

This was the last Confederations Cup held before being folded after being confirmed by FIFA that it will no longer hold anymore Confederation Cup matches in order to make way for the FIFA Club World Cup expansion, along with the 2021 FIFA Arab Cup.

Qualification
The eight competing teams were the host nation, the reigning FIFA World Cup champions, and the six holders of the FIFA confederation championships. If any team qualified for multiple berths (such as, if the World Cup champions also won their continental championship), the next best-placed team from their continental championship would have qualified.

After Russia secured a spot in the tournament as the hosts, Germany were the first team to qualify via competition, after winning the 2014 FIFA World Cup in Brazil. The final match saw the Germans clinch the country's fourth world title through a 1–0 extra-time win against Argentina. Australia were the next team to qualify after beating South Korea 2–1 after extra time, in the 2015 AFC Asian Cup Final. This victory marked Australia's first Asian Cup win since their move from the Oceania Football Confederation (OFC) in 2006. It was also the first time a team had become champions of two confederations, following Australia's four OFC Nations Cup titles. Chile were the fourth team to secure a spot at the 2017 FIFA Confederations Cup after defeating Argentina 4–1 on a penalty shoot-out following a 0–0 draw after extra time, in the 2015 Copa América Final.

As 2015 CONCACAF Gold Cup champions, Mexico's qualifying path saw them face 2013 CONCACAF Gold Cup champions United States in the 2015 CONCACAF Cup play-off match. The new format, in which the two most recent CONCACAF Gold Cup winners compete to decide the representative team of CONCACAF, was won by Mexico 3–2 after extra time. New Zealand were the sixth team to qualify for the tournament after defeating Papua New Guinea 4–2 on a penalty shoot-out following a 0–0 draw after extra time, in the 2016 OFC Nations Cup Final.

Portugal were the seventh team to qualify, after defeating host nation France 1–0 after extra time, in the UEFA Euro 2016 Final. The 2017 Africa Cup of Nations winning team, Cameroon, took the eighth and final spot with their 2–1 win against Egypt in the 2017 Africa Cup of Nations Final. This was the first time in FIFA Confederations Cup history that three national teams from any single confederation (Russia, Germany and Portugal from UEFA) participated in the tournament.

Qualified teams
The following teams qualified for the tournament.

Venues
Four cities served as the venues for the 2017 FIFA Confederations Cup. All four venues were also among the 12 used for the 2018 FIFA World Cup.

On 8 October 2015, FIFA and the Local Organising Committee agreed on the official names of the stadiums used during the tournament.

Schedule
The full schedule was announced by FIFA on 24 July 2015 (without kick-off times, which were confirmed later). Russia was placed in position A1 in the group stage and played in the opening match against New Zealand at the Zenit Arena in Saint Petersburg on 17 June. The distribution of the knockout stage matches was as follows:
The Krestovsky Stadium in Saint Petersburg hosted the final on 2 July.
The Kazan Arena in Kazan hosted the first semi-final on 28 June.
The Fisht Olympic Stadium in Sochi hosted the second semi-final on 29 June.
The Otkritie Arena in Moscow hosted the third place match on 2 July.

Draw
The draw took place on 26 November 2016, 18:00 MSK (UTC+3), at the Tennis Academy in Kazan.

For the draw, the eight teams were allocated to two pots. Pot 1 contained hosts Russia and the three highest-ranked teams in the November 2016 edition of the FIFA World Rankings (shown in parentheses below): Germany, Chile, and Portugal. Pot 2 contained the remaining four teams: Mexico, Australia, New Zealand and the winners of the 2017 Africa Cup of Nations (whose identity was not known at the time of the draw and regardless of their identity could not be among the three highest-ranked participating teams), which was won by Cameroon on 5 February 2017 to complete the line-up.

The eight teams were drawn into two groups of four with each group containing two teams from Pot 1 and two teams from Pot 2. During the draw procedure, teams were drawn into alternating groups (Group A, then Group B, repeating) and assigned a position within the group by drawing another ball. As hosts, Russia were automatically assigned to Position A1 in the draw. Since there were three teams from Europe, one of the two groups was certain to contain two teams from the same confederation (Russia and Portugal), the first time this happened in a FIFA Confederations Cup.

Match officials
A total of 9 refereeing trios (a referee and two assistant referees), 1 support referee, and 8 video assistant referees were appointed for the tournament.

Match ball

The official match ball for the Cup was produced by Adidas and was named "Krasava", which is a Russian slang word for "beautiful" or "awesome".

Squads

Each team had to name a preliminary squad of 30 players. From the preliminary squad, the team had to name a final squad of 23 players (three of whom must be goalkeepers) by the FIFA deadline. Players in the final squad could be replaced due to serious injury up to 24 hours prior to kickoff of the team's first match, where the replacement players did not need to be in the preliminary squad. The official squads were announced by FIFA on 8 June 2017.

Group stage
All times are local, MSK (UTC+3).

Tiebreakers
The top two teams of each group advanced to the semi-finals. The rankings of teams in each group were determined as follows (regulations Article 19.6):

If two or more teams were equal on the basis of the above three criteria, their rankings were determined as follows:

Group A

Group B

Knockout stage

In the knockout stage, if a match was level at the end of normal playing time, extra time was played (two periods of 15 minutes each), where each team was allowed to make a fourth substitution. If still tied after extra time, the match was decided by a penalty shoot-out to determine the winners.

Bracket

Semi-finals

Third place play-off

Final

Awards
The following awards were given at the conclusion of the tournament. The player awards were all sponsored by Adidas.

Additionally, FIFA.com shortlisted six goals so that football fans could vote on the tournaments' best. The poll closed on 10 July.

Statistics

Goalscorers

Tournament ranking

Prize money
Based on final position, teams received prize money from FIFA.

Ticketing
Tickets were distributed in four stages: pre-sale for holders of Visa cards, random draw, first-come first-served, and last-minute sales.

Sponsorship

Broadcasting rights

Logistics
Free travel via additional trains travelling between host cities during the sporting events were provided to spectators holding match tickets or documents granting access to the match, along with FAN ID.

FAN IDs were issued to all spectators of the FIFA Confederations Cup 2017 for access to a stadium. FAN ID gave the opportunity to use free transport services on the match days in the cities hosting the sports events. The foreign citizens, who come to the Russian Federation as spectators of the FIFA Confederations Cup 2017 matches, could use their FAN IDs for multiple visa-free entry into and exit from the Russian Federation upon presentation of valid identity documents that are recognized as such by the Russian Federation, during the period that started ten days before the date of the first match and ended ten days after the date of the last match of the FIFA Confederations Cup 2017.

In 2015, the Russian Ministry of Sport and Local Organising Committee launched a website aimed at providing coverage of the preparation process ahead of the 2017 FIFA Confederations Cup and 2018 FIFA World Cup.

References

External links

 FIFA Confederations Cup, FIFA.com
 FIFA Technical Report

 
2016–17 in Russian football
Confederations Cup
2017
June 2017 sports events in Russia
July 2017 sports events in Russia
2017 Fifa Confederations Cup